is a female Japanese singer under the self-published label Closed/Underground. She has released several songs that have served as theme songs for anime shows, including Higurashi When They Cry, My Wife is the Student Council President, Shin Koihime Muso, and Kokoro Connect.

Discography

Albums

Singles

Filmography

References

External links 
  
 Rekka Katakairi profile at Team Entertainment 
 
 Rekka Katakiri profile at Oricon 
 Rekka Katakiri albums at CD Japan 
 Rekka Katakiri at Visual Novel Database

Doujin music
Japanese women singers
Living people
Anime musicians
Video game musicians
Singers from Tokyo
Year of birth missing (living people)